Sexy Boy may refer to:Nova the sextets boi 

 "Sexy Boy" (Air song), a song by the French band Air
 "Sexy Boy (Soyokaze ni Yorisotte)", a song by the Japanese girl idol group Morning Musume
 "Sexy Boy", entrance music of professional wrestler Shawn Michaels